Arnold Herbert Dyson (10 July 1905 – 7 June 1978) was an English first-class cricketer who played for Glamorgan.

Dyson was born in Halifax, Yorkshire and played as a right-handed opening batsman, often partnering Emrys Davies. A consistent batsman, he passed 1000 runs in all but one season from 1931 until 1947. During this time he set a record for 305 consecutive appearances in the County Championship.

External links
CricketArchive profile

1905 births
1978 deaths
English cricketers
Glamorgan cricketers
English cricketers of 1919 to 1945
Sir Julien Cahn's XI cricketers